Iury is a Brazilian masculine first name. It is a variation of Iurii. It is also a variation of the Spanish and Portuguese name Jorge.

People with this name 
 Iury (footballer, born 1995), Brazilian footballer
 Iury (footballer, born 1998), football player for Villa Nova

See also
 Yuri (disambiguation)
 Yury

References 

Brazilian given names
Portuguese masculine given names